This is a list of shopping malls in Egypt.

Alexandria
 City Centre Alexandria
San Stefano Grand Plaza

Cairo 
 City Centre Maadi
 Mall of Egypt
Tiba Outlet Mall

Egypt
Shopping malls